Sir Arthur Blyth  (19 March 1823 – 7 December 1891) was Premier of South Australia three times; 1864–65, 1871–72 and 1873–75.

Early life

The son of William Blyth and his wife, Sarah Wilkins, he was born at Birmingham, England on 21 March 1823. His formative years were spent in Birmingham, and he was educated at King Edward's School, Birmingham, and arrived with his parents in South Australia in 1839 on the "Ariadne" at the age of 16. His father, who was appointed a Justice of the Peace and became a Councillor of the City Corporation in 1840, and afterwards one of the City Commissioners, established an ironmongery business in Hindley Street, Adelaide, which Blyth entered with his brother Neville. He interested himself in municipal work and was a member of the central road board. In 1855 he was elected for Yatala in the old legislative council and assisted in framing the new constitution.

Early in 1857 he was elected as one of the representatives of Gumeracha in the first house of assembly, and in August became commissioner of public works in the John Baker ministry which, however, was defeated on 1 September. On 12 June 1858 he was given the same position in the Hanson ministry, which remained in power until May 1860. In October 1861 he became Treasurer of South Australia in the Waterhouse ministry which, however, was reconstructed nine days later, when Blyth dropped out. He came back to the ministry, however, as Treasurer in February 1862, and was selected as one of the three representatives of South Australia at the intercolonial conference held in Melbourne in March and April 1863.

He was a member of the Agricultural and Horticultural Society and its president for the year 1867–68.

As premier

On 4 August 1864, Blyth, taking the positions of premier and commissioner of crown lands and immigration, formed his first ministry, but it was difficult to do useful work, much time being wasted in no-confidence motions. Blyth resigned on 22 March 1865, was Treasurer in the third ministry formed by Henry Ayers but was out of office again in little more than a month.

In March 1866 he became Chief Secretary in James Boucaut's first ministry from March 1866 to May 1867. He was Treasurer again in the first John Hart ministry in September 1868, but this ministry was defeated three weeks later. He took the position of commissioner of crown lands and immigration in the second Hart ministry, which lasted from 30 May 1870 to 10 November 1871, when Blyth formed his second ministry, but resigned only ten weeks later.

Third time as premier

On 22 July 1873 he again became premier and this time took the portfolio of Chief Secretary of South Australia. This ministry was a comparatively stable one and lasted until June 1875. It succeeded in doing something for immigration, and after a stern fight passed a free, secular, and compulsory education bill through the assembly. This was defeated in the council. It succeeded, however, in passing an act incorporating the University of Adelaide. From 10 February 1875 to 21 February 1877 he represented North Adelaide.

Later years

On 25 March 1876 Blyth became Treasurer in the third Boucaut ministry which resigned less than three months later. In February 1877 he was appointed agent-general for South Australia in London and held the position capably for many years. He was a councillor of the Oxford Military College in Cowley and Oxford Oxfordshire from 1876–96. He was a representative of South Australia at the 1887 colonial conference.

Blyth died in Bournemouth, England on 7 December 1891. His widow died two weeks later, on 21 December.

Family

Arthur's younger brother, Neville Blyth, had a significant political career, being first elected to the House of Assembly for the seat of East Torrens in 1860.

Arthur Blyth married Jessie Ann Forrest (1827–21 December 1891), a daughter of Edward Forrest of Birmingham, on 5 March 1850; she died two weeks after her husband.

Emily Grant Blyth (died 31 December 1926) married Robert Grant Murray R.N.R. on 23 August 1893
(John) James Neville Blyth (20 November 1850 – ), married Elizabeth Emma Hawker (daughter of James Collins Hawker and granddaughter of Thomas Lipson) on 11 June 1873. In 1885 he was jailed for a year for passing valueless cheques. The couple divorced in 1908.
Frances Eleanor Blyth (9 February 1855 – ) married Wiliam Briggs Sells on 16 January 1877.

Recognition
The Hundred of Blyth (SA) in the Mid North of South Australia, and hence the later township of Blyth, was named for him in 1860 by Governor MacDonnell.

The Blyth River in the Northern Territory was named after him by Francis Cadell in 1867. The Hundred of Blyth (NT) was also named for him in 1871.

He was knighted KCMG in 1877 and appointed CB in 1886.

The Hundred of Jessie and possibly the ceased government town of Jessie were named for his wife.

Notes

References

Further reading
 

|-

|-

|-

|-

|-

|-

|-

|-

|-

|-

|-

|-

|-

|-

|-

|-

1823 births
1891 deaths
Premiers of South Australia
English emigrants to colonial Australia
Australian Knights Commander of the Order of St Michael and St George
Australian politicians awarded knighthoods
Australian Companions of the Order of the Bath
People from Birmingham, West Midlands
Treasurers of South Australia
Settlers of South Australia
Adelaide Club
19th-century Australian politicians